The list of ship launches in 1878 includes a chronological list of some ships launched in 1878.


References

Sources

1878
Ship launches